The Dream Book is a live album by multi-instrumentalist Joe McPhee and bassist Dominic Duval recorded at the Knitting Factory in 1999 and released on the Cadence Jazz label.

Reception

Allmusic reviewer Steve Loewy states "With total command of their instruments, and endless ideas, the duo produces expectantly stunning results. Wondrous and evocative".

Track listing 
All compositions by Joe McPhee and Domenic Duval except where noted.
 "Dance of the Reasons Why" – 18:53
 "Beyond the Truth-Lies" – 8:17
 "Moffett's Motif" – 6:39
 "Old Eyes" (Joe McPhee) – 5:28
 "Caught in the Moment" – 10:14
 "And Then Red" – 4:54
 "Celebration" – 2:00

Personnel 
Joe McPhee – alto saxophone, pocket trumpet
Dominic Duval – bass

References 

Joe McPhee live albums
1999 live albums
Cadence Jazz Records live albums
Albums recorded at the Knitting Factory